Benoît Delhomme (born 28 August 1961) is a French film cinematographer who has also worked in American and British films. He graduated from the École nationale supérieure Louis-Lumière in 1982. He was assistant cameraman on Jean de Florette and Manon des Sources (1986) and became director of photography on feature films in the early 1990s. He was nominated for the César Award for Best Cinematography in 1998 for Artemisia. During the 2000s, he worked more and more for English-speaking movies. He won the Special Jury Prize at the International Film Festival Chicago 2001 for What Time Is It There? and the AFI Award for Best Cinematography in 2005 for The Proposition.

Filmography

External links

French cinematographers
1961 births
Living people